"Bad Ass Strippa" is the debut single by English rapper and singer Jentina from her eponymous debut album, Jentina (2005). It was released in Ireland, Italy, and the United Kingdom.  It achieved average success in Italy and the UK, despite a heavy advertising campaign including adverts on primetime television in the latter. The single features many remixes, including an instrumental version of the song.

A music video was made, featuring Jentina in the streets, walking and dancing in a provocative fashion.

The track was later parodied by British hip hop/grime MC Lady Sovereign with its name changed to "Sad Ass Stripah". In 2010, "Bad Ass Strippa" was featured in the BBC Three make-under program Snog Marry Avoid?.

Track listing

CD 1
"Bad Ass Strippa"
"Bad Ass Strippa" (Dave Kelly Remix)
"Bad Ass Strippa" (Radio Slave Remix)
"Bad Ass Strippa" (extended mix)
"Bad Ass Strippa" (instrumental)
"Bad Ass Strippa" (CD-ROM video)

CD 2
"Bad Ass Strippa"
"Bad Ass Strippa" (instrumental)

12"

Side 1
"Bad Ass Strippa"
"Bad Ass Strippa" (Dave Kelly Remix)

Side 2
"Bad Ass Strippa" (Radio Slave Remix)

Chart performance

References

2004 debut singles
Jentina songs
Novelty songs
Songs written by Matt Rowe (songwriter)
Songs written by Kenny Gamble
Songs written by Leon Huff
2004 songs
Virgin Records singles